Rafivirumab (CR57) is a monoclonal antibody for the prophylaxis of rabies.

References 

Monoclonal antibodies
Experimental drugs